Tommy Freeman may refer to:

 Tomás Freeman, Irish Gaelic footballer
 Tommy Freeman (boxer) (1904–1986), American boxer
 Tommy Freeman (rugby union) (born 2001), English rugby player